Surinder Singh Sodhi is a former field hockey player from India. He is famous for playing a major role in getting India the gold medal in 1980 Olympic games after a gap of 16 years. He played in the center forward position.

In the final against Spain, Surinder Singh Sodhi gave India a rousing start as it established a comfortable three-goal lead early in the second half. Surinder Singh Sodhi scoring 2 of those. But Spain gamely bounced back into the game with 2 unanswered goals. With Spain raiding the Indian defence, and with only 6 minutes left, Mohammed Shahid scored a goal. However, with only 4 minutes remaining, Spain scored yet again with their skipper Juan Amat completing his hattrick. The atmosphere in the last few minutes was electric, and India finally won the thriller 4-3, and thus regained the elusive gold after a long time. In previous games Surinder Singh Sodhi scored 5 goals against Tanzania and 4 goals against Cuba.

The 15 goals scored by him in the 1980 Moscow Olympics is the second highest goals at the games and highest tally by an Indian in an Olympic hockey competition. It equalised the earlier record of 15 goals set by the great Udham Singh in the 1956 Melbourne Olympics.

References

External links

Pakistan honoured four former Indian Olympians including Surinder Singh Sodhi. 20 September 2004. The Hindu.

Year of birth missing (living people)
Olympic field hockey players of India
Olympic gold medalists for India
Field hockey players at the 1980 Summer Olympics
Recipients of the Arjuna Award
Living people
Sportspeople from Firozpur
Field hockey players from Punjab, India
Olympic medalists in field hockey
Indian male field hockey players
Medalists at the 1980 Summer Olympics
Asian Games medalists in field hockey
Field hockey players at the 1978 Asian Games
Asian Games silver medalists for India
Medalists at the 1978 Asian Games